Devi is a 1970 film directed by V. Madhusudan Rao.

Film poster 
The film posters show different themes of the film as was often done with posters.  The First shows the dutiful mother and wife caring for her child.  The second shows the man smoking while leering at a dancing girl.

Cast
 Nutan as Devi
 Sanjeev Kumar as Dr. Shekhar
 Rehman as Shekhar's Elder Brother
 Madan Puri as Joginder 
 Mehmood as Rajaram
 Aruna Irani as Rani
 Farida Jalal as Shobha
 Lalita Pawar as Shobha's Mother
 Sulochana Latkar as Jamna 
 Manmohan Krishna as Dharamdas 
 Gajanan Jagirdar as Ram Singh 
 Mukri as Sunder
 Lalita Kumari as Laxmi 
 Dina Pathak as Dharamdas' Sister
 Manorama as Munnibai
 Sarika as Master Deepak

Soundtrack

References

External links 
 

1970 films
1970 drama films
Indian drama films
1970s Hindi-language films
Films directed by V. Madhusudhana Rao
Films scored by Laxmikant–Pyarelal
Hindi-language drama films